Royal Central may refer to:

 Royal Central School in London
 Royal Central College, Polonnaruwa in Sri Lanka
 Royal Central College, Telijjawila in Sri Lanka
 Royal Central Asian Society
 Journal of the Royal Central Asian Society